Van Kempen is a Dutch toponymic surname meaning "from Kempen", a German city at the Dutch border. The Kempen region of the Low Countries is also a possible origin, e.g. in the case of Ludwig van Kempen. People with this name include:

 Ad van Kempen (born 1944), Dutch film actor
 Kenneth van Kempen (born 1987), Dutch basketball player
 Ludwig van Kempen (1304–1361), Flemish Benedictine monk and music theorist
 Michiel van Kempen (born 1957), Dutch writer, art historian and literary critic
 Paul van Kempen (1893–1955), Dutch conductor
  (1898–1985), Dutch racing cyclist
 Thomas van Kempen (circa 1380-1471), Dutch theologian

See also
Van Kampen
Kempen (disambiguation)

References

Dutch-language surnames
Toponymic surnames